Poecilobrium is a monotypic beetle genus in the family Cerambycidae first described by Horn in 1883. Its single species, Poecilobrium chalybeum, was described by John Lawrence LeConte in 1873.

References

Cerambycinae
Beetles described in 1873
Monotypic beetle genera